Piranshahr Garrison ( – Pādegān-e Pīrānshahr) is a village and military installation in Piran Rural District, in the Central District of Piranshahr County, West Azerbaijan Province, Iran. At the 2006 census, its population was 589, in 160 families.

References 

Populated places in Piranshahr County
Military installations of Iran